Derek Stokes (13 September 1939 – 24 May 2022) was an English professional footballer who played for Bradford City and Huddersfield Town during the 1950s and 1960s, as a striker.

Early life
Born in Snydale near Normanton, Stokes was the youngest of 11 children, 10 boys and 1 girl.

Career
Stokes began his career with Bolton Wanderers and Snydale Road Athletic, before moving from Snydale to Bradford City in May 1956. He had two spells with the club which saw him score 55 goals in 126 league games. He scored in 8 consecutive matches between 26 December 1959 and 6 February 1960, scoring a total of 14 goals; the record was later matched by Nahki Wells.

His time at Bradford City was split by a spell with Huddersfield Town. In total, he scored 120 goals in 279 Football League appearances for the two clubs. He scored on both of his debuts for Bradford City and on his debut for Huddersfield.

He later played in Ireland with Dundalk, scoring 58 goals in 122 goals in all competitions for the club, before finishing his career with Drogheda United.

He also played for England under-23s.

Later life and death
After retiring in 1970 he worked as a golf steward and publican. Stokes was diagnosed with Alzheimer's, a form of dementia in 2019. He retired to Charmouth in Dorset, then moved up to Wyke in Bradford. He died on 24 May 2022, aged 82.

References

1939 births
2022 deaths
Sportspeople from Normanton, West Yorkshire
English footballers
Association football forwards
England under-23 international footballers
English Football League players
League of Ireland players
Bradford City A.F.C. players
Huddersfield Town A.F.C. players
Dundalk F.C. players
Bolton Wanderers F.C. players
Drogheda United F.C. players